The 2017 Bucknell Bison football team represented Bucknell University in the 2017 NCAA Division I FCS football season. They were led by eighth-year head coach Joe Susan and played their home games at Christy Mathewson–Memorial Stadium. They were a member of the Patriot League. They finished the season 5–6, 2–4 in Patriot League play to finish in sixth place.

Schedule
The 2017 schedule consists of five home and five away games. The Bison will host Patriot League foes Holy Cross, Lehigh, and Georgetown, and will travel to Lafayette, Colgate, and Fordham.

In 2017, Bucknell's non-conference opponents will be Marist of the Pioneer Football League, William & Mary of the Colonial Athletic Association, Sacred Heart of the Northeast Conference, and Cornell of the Ivy League.

Game summaries

Marist

Holy Cross

at William & Mary

Sacred Heart

Monmouth

at Cornell

at Lafayette

at Colgate

Lehigh

Georgetown

at Fordham

References

Bucknell
Bucknell Bison football seasons
Bucknell Bison football